Wyre Piddle is a village and civil parish in the Wychavon district of Worcestershire, England.  It is on the River Avon, near where that river is joined by the Piddle Brook - between Evesham and Pershore.

History

Two archaeological excavations in the area have found evidence of late Iron Age and Roman occupation and also an enclosed pastoral settlement with four periods of occupation dating from the Middle Iron Age.

In 1967 a hoard of 219 silver coins, some from as early as 1280 and none later than 1467, was found there.

It was the home village of Claude Choules, who was born in Pershore on 3 March 1901 and became the last surviving male veteran of World War I. He moved to Australia in 1926 and died in Perth, Western Australia on 5 May 2011, aged 110.

Amenities
There are two public houses situated in Wyre, The Anchor Inn and The Hotel. The Anchor Inn used to serve Wyre Piddle's locally brewed beer 'Piddle in The Hole' before the Wyre Piddle brewery was dissolved in September 2015. The Hotel is the venue for frequent live music events and is a Bohemian mecca for local artists and musicians.

External links

Archaeology on the Wyre Piddle Bypass
The Wyre Piddle Medieval Silver Coin Hoard

Villages in Worcestershire
Wychavon